Petros, the original Greek and Coptic version of the name Peter meaning "stone" or "rock", may refer to:

 Petros I (disambiguation)
 Petros II (disambiguation)
 Petros III (disambiguation)
 Petros IV (disambiguation)
 Petros V (disambiguation)
 Petros VI (disambiguation)
 Petros Adamian (1849–1891), Armenian actor, writer and artist
 Petros Avetisyan (born 1996), Armenian footballer
 Petros Bereketis (17th century), Greek-Ottoman musician
 Petros Byzantios (fl. 1770–1808), Greek-Ottoman musician
 Petros Clerides (born 1946), former attorney general of Cyprus
 Petros Duryan (1851–1872), Armenian poet, playwright and actor
 Petros Elia of Baz (1880–1932), better known as Agha Petros, an Assyrian leader during World War I
 Petros Fyssoun (1933–2016), Greek actor
 Petros Galaktopoulos (born 1945), Greek Olympic Greco-Roman wrestler
 Petros Ichkos (c. 1755–1808), Serbian-Ottoman diplomat and merchant
 Petros Mantalos (born 1991), Greek footballer
 Petros Matheus dos Santos Araújo (born 1989), Brazilian footballer
 Petrobey Mavromichalis (1765–1848), Greek prime minister originally named Petros
 Petros Molyviatis (born 1928), Greek politician and diplomat
 Petros Noeas (born 1987), Greek professional basketball player
 Petros Papadakis (born 1977), American sportscaster
 Petros Peloponnesios (c. 1735–1778), Greek teacher of Byzantine and Ottoman music
 Petros Petrosyan (1968–2012), Armenian painter
 Petros Protopapadakis (1854–1922), Greek prime minister
 Pete Sampras (born 1971), American tennis player
 Petros Serghiou Florides (born 1958), Cypriot mathematical physicist
 Petros Sithole, South African politician
 Petros Solomon (born 1951), Eritrean politician
 Petros Tsitsipas (born 2000), Greek tennis player
 Petros Vassiliadis (born 1945), Greek biblical scholar and author

References

Armenian masculine given names
Greek masculine given names
African masculine given names